Henri Alexandre Plommet (6 January 1872 – 10 July 1910) was a French fencer. He competed in the men's épée and the men's foil events at the 1900 Summer Olympics.

References

External links
 

1872 births
1910 deaths
French male épée fencers
French male foil fencers
Olympic fencers of France
Fencers at the 1900 Summer Olympics
People from Compiègne
Sportspeople from Oise